Justin Michael Reed (January 16, 1982 – October 20, 2017) was an American professional basketball player, who played at the small forward position.

College career

Reed led the University of Mississippi's Ole Miss Rebels as part of the "Provine Posse", the three former Provine High School teammates who played together for the Rebels (the other two being Aaron Harper and David Sanders).

Under the tutelage of 2001 Naismith Coach of the Year Rod Barnes, Reed became an all-around player and a dominant force in the Southeastern Conference. An All-SEC selection in each of his four years at The University of Mississippi, Reed led the team both on the court and in the locker room. As a freshman, Reed guided the Rebels through two NCAA tournament wins en route to a first ever "Sweet Sixteen" appearance for the Ole Miss program in 2001.

NBA career
Following his successful career as a forward at the University of Mississippi, Reed was selected in the second round (40th overall) by the Boston Celtics in the 2004 NBA draft. Following one and one-half seasons with little playing time, he was traded to the Minnesota Timberwolves on January 26, 2006, in a multi-player deal; he enjoyed a successful 40 games with the Timberwolves and, at season's end, became a restricted free agent. Minnesota then rewarded him with a three-year contract worth $4,310,500.

On June 14, 2007, it was officially announced that Reed and teammate Mike James would be traded to the Houston Rockets, for Juwan Howard. He was subsequently waived by the Rockets without having appeared in a single game for them.

Death
Reed died from angiosarcoma, a cancer of the blood, on October 20, 2017.

References

External links
NBA.com profile

1982 births
2017 deaths
African-American basketball players
American men's basketball players
Austin Toros players
Bakersfield Jam players
Basketball players from Jackson, Mississippi
Boston Celtics draft picks
Boston Celtics players
Deaths from angiosarcoma
Deaths from cancer in Mississippi
Medalists at the 2001 Summer Universiade
Minnesota Timberwolves players
Ole Miss Rebels men's basketball players
Parade High School All-Americans (boys' basketball)
Power forwards (basketball)
Small forwards
Universiade bronze medalists for the United States
Universiade medalists in basketball
20th-century African-American people
21st-century African-American sportspeople